GCB (also known as Good Christian Bitches and Good Christian Belles) is an American comedy-drama television series developed by Robert Harling, produced by Darren Star, and starring Kristin Chenoweth, Leslie Bibb, Jennifer Aspen, Miriam Shor, Marisol Nichols, and Annie Potts. Based on the semi-autobiographical 2008 novel Good Christian Bitches by Kim Gatlin, the series centers on a recently widowed woman who moves her family back to the upscale Dallas-area town where she grew up.

The series debuted on ABC as a mid-season replacement for Pan Am in the 2011–12 television season, on March 4, 2012. On May 11, 2012, both series were canceled by ABC. In its series finale, GCB drew 5.6 million viewers.

A reboot of the series, also titled Good Christian Bitches, was greenlit by The CW in November 2018.

Synopsis
The series follows Amanda Vaughn (Leslie Bibb), former high-school "Queen Bitch" and recently widowed mother of two, who returns to her hometown of Highland Park, Texas, an enclave of Dallas. Formerly rich, Amanda lost everything when her husband was exposed as stealing billions of dollars from investors and died in a car crash with his mistress. She meets the former schoolmates she used to mock: Carlene Cockburn (Kristin Chenoweth), the new "Queen Bitch"; Sharon Peacham (Jennifer Aspen), who was beautiful in high school and is now heavy and insecure and does the bulk of Carlene's bidding; glamorous business mogul Cricket Caruth-Reilly (Miriam Shor), whose husband, Blake (Mark Deklin), is gay; and Heather Cruz (Marisol Nichols), a powerful Dallas real-estate agent. Amanda and her teenage children move in with her wealthy 60-something mother Gigi Stopper (Annie Potts), who tries to influence Amanda's parenting and style choices, and gives her advice about strategic maneuvering among these women. While Amanda has grown considerably since high school and wants to move on with her life, Carlene and the others still resent Amanda.  They don't believe she's changed and are out to drive her away.

Cast and characters

Main characters
 Leslie Bibb as Amanda Vaughn (née Stopper), the protagonist of the series. A newly single mother and widow from Santa Barbara, California who moves back to her childhood hometown of Highland Park, Texas, with her two teenage children after her businessman husband, Bill (Greg Vaughan), dies in a car accident with his mistress who are attempting to flee the country after stealing billions of dollars from investors in a Ponzi scheme. In high school, Amanda was the head cheerleader and most popular girl in school. She was also leader of a clique of so-called "mean girls" whom were called the "Foxes." Also known as the school's "it girl" or "queen bitch," Amanda used intimidation, terror and bullying to control her friends and enemies. Having lost everything, she now tries to change her life and redeem herself to her former classmates whom have formed their own clique called the "GCB's."  Amanda is a recovering alcoholic, but falls off the wagon in the final episode when she is forced to drink tequila when she and the GCB's are lost in a desert. At the end of the series' final episode Pastor Tudor kisses her, and she kisses back.
 Kristin Chenoweth as Carlene Cockburn (née Lourd), the main antagonist of the series. She is a former "javelina" (literally a skunk pig) — a derisive nickname for girls outside the popular "Foxes" — who was a frequent target of Amanda's bullying and teasing throughout high school due to her short height and ugly appearance. After several plastic surgery procedures, she is now attractive and the new leader of the GCB's clique. While she claims to be a good Christian, she holds a personal grudge against Amanda and is judgmental of her, refusing to accept Amanda's apology for her past mistreatment and abuse, or to believe that Amanda is a better person now. Crafty and manipulative, she works behind the scenes to ruin Amanda's life in order to drive her out of town, or possibly worse. She is also a plastic-surgery addict. Carlene is the owner of Boobylicious, a local Hooters-like bar. Discovering how Ripp also lost money to Amanda's husband's Ponzi scheme, she's convinced Amanda believes Bill to still be alive and wants to find out the truth. Talking with Amanda convinces Carlene that Bill is really dead, and that going after Amanda might cause her to face retribution from God. Carlene also blackmailed Amanda, using public disgrace against Gigi, after she went on a date with Carlene's younger brother, Luke. After Gigi sorted out the blackmail, Amanda got back together with Luke to the disgust of Carlene. She starts a "Purity Club" but is criticized by Pastor Tudor for going too far making sex look evil. When she and Amanda discover Amanda's daughter, Laura, kissing Carlene's son, Landry, the two put their differences aside to talk to the kids. Carlene confesses to Laura that she constantly slept around in high school and regrets it. In the season finale, Carlene is rocked to discover that Ripp has a 22-year-old daughter he never told her about.
 Jennifer Aspen as Sharon Peacham (née Johnson), current member of the GCB's and a former beauty queen who is now focused on cooking meals for her husband, Zack, and children. She has gained weight and reluctantly allows herself to be pushed around by Carlene. Although a former Fox in high school, she competed in a beauty pageant against Amanda where she was sabotaged to lose by Amanda and has held a grudge against her ever since. Her husband, Zack, also has a huge crush on Amanda, which threatens Sharon. When she confronts him about kissing Amanda, he talks of how Amanda was a reminder of his glory days but insists he still loves Sharon. She responds that she had "glory days" too and thinks she can have even more. She sets up her own Bible-inspired weight-loss company, called "Losin' It With Jesus", which causes her to consider herself a successful businesswoman, much to Cricket's chagrin. In the finale, Zack sells her company to a Caruth subsidiary without Sharon's knowledge; although Sharon is furious, Cricket is impressed, since her underlings have instructions to acquire only the best.
 Marisol Nichols as Heather Cruz, a single woman, the most successful realtor in their town, and another friend of Carlene's and member of the GCB's. She used to be an outsider back in high school because she was poor (her mother worked in the school cafeteria as the cook), but Gigi took her under her wing and helped her become the successful real estate agent she is now. Despite the fact Heather also used to be an occasional target of Amanda's bullying and abuse in school, she is the only one of the GCB's who accepts Amanda's apologies and befriends her, largely in part because Heather does not hold any personal grudge against Amanda, unlike the rest of the GCB's. Heather eventually defies Carlene by openly by refusing to stay away from Amanda. She is also the resident "gossip girl" of the clique.
 Miriam Shor as Cricket Caruth-Reilly, a strong-willed business woman and another one of Carlene's friends and member of the GCB's. She is just as crafty and wicked as Carlene, and sometimes competes against her for the spotlight. Similar to Carlene and Sharon, Cricket also holds a personal grudge against Amanda because, in high school, Amanda stole her boyfriend (who happened to be Bill) and spread a false rumor that turned her into a outcast "javelina." She does her best to prevent Amanda from getting a job or feeling welcome in their hometown. As a teenager, her father constantly criticized her and told her she would never have the capability to run the family business of a clothing company. She knows the truth about her husband Blake's homosexuality, but stays with him because she feels that he is the only man in her life who loves her for who she is and not for her money. Cricket is well known as a fitness fanatic, which is a cover for her extramarital sexual affairs. When Blake hires Amanda to design a line of jeans for her company, Cricket publicly praises Amanda's skill as a designer, but secretly sabotages the product (and her own company) because she is jealous of Blake and Amanda's friendship and refuses to forget that Amanda stole Bill from her. Cricket slowly develops a grudging respect for Amanda as the series goes on. At one point, Cricket privately thanks Amanda for stealing Bill away from her by pointing out that if she didn't, Bill would have cheated on and stole from Cricket had she ended up marrying Bill.
 David James Elliott as Ripp Cockburn, Carlene's husband, the only one of the local men who seems hostile or indifferent to Amanda. He indicates that he and Amanda's late husband, Bill, have a past. It later turns out that Ripp lost a lot of money to Bill's Ponzi scheme and is convinced Amanda knows where it is hidden and should help him locate it. In fact, after reading notes Amanda wrote to get her feelings out about Bill, he and Carlene believe that Bill is still alive and hiding with their money. Even after finding proof that Bill really is dead, Ripp refuses to accept it.
 Mark Deklin as Blake Reilly, Cricket's husband who is secretly gay, although Cricket knows and helps keep his secret. In the early episodes, he was in love with his ranch foreman, Booth Becker. Blake and Booth broke up over Blake canceling plans to celebrate their anniversary because he wanted to see his cheerleader daughter perform at a pep rally. He now has a new ranch foreman (and "love interest") named Rusty. Blake, like most of the men in their town, is friendly with Amanda, though in his case it is actual friendship and not attraction. Blake is the second-in-command of Cricket's company, and personally designs most of their clothing lines. He enjoys being a father, and approaches Cricket about having another child, since their daughter is about to go away to college. He and Cricket first consider surrogate motherhood, but later decide to try the old-fashioned way, with comic results.
 Brad Beyer as Zack Peacham, Sharon's lecherous, luxury car dealership-owning husband who secretly loves Amanda. He kisses her against her wishes, unfortunately with Carlene spying it, believing Amanda encouraged it, and reporting it to Sharon. He was drafted by the Dallas Cowboys but injured his knee, so he tries to convince Sharon that kissing Amanda was about trying to reclaim his "glory years," and insists she is the only woman he has ever truly loved.
 Annie Potts as Elizabeth "Gigi" Stopper, Amanda's Christian mother and local socialite. She made "Gigi" her nickname because of her dislike of being called "Grandma." Despite Amanda's insistence about wanting to live a normal life, Gigi pushes her to be part of Dallas high society. Gigi and Amanda still have issues over Amanda's belief that Gigi can't accept her wanting her own life, and believing that Gigi is embarrassed by her. Gigi always thought Bill was no good for Amanda and enjoys saying "I told you so" about Amanda's mistakes in life. However, as the series progressed, she expressed that she is proud of how strong her daughter is, and starts to support her in many things, even those that involve Amanda's rivalry with Carlene. When Carlene's Uncle Burl and his wife Bitsy (Gigi's high school rival) come to town, Gigi is happy to see them, as she and Burl have always gotten along well. Burl reveals he has a heart condition. Bitsy, believing Gigi wants her husband, intends to take him on a worldwide cruise, preferring he die with her rather than be with Gigi. However, Bitsy ends up dying in Gigi's home when she chokes on a pork rib. Immediately after the funeral Burl tries to get together with Gigi, but Gigi claims it would be wrong so soon after his wife died. Later Gigi and Burl secretly try to get together; Carlene thinks it's Amanda with her brother Luke, and uses "Neighborhood Watch" to catch them. At the fundraiser the next day, Gigi tells everyone by kissing Burl in front of everyone.

Recurring characters
 Tyler Jacob Moore (Donny Boaz in the pilot) as Pastor John Tudor, minister at Hillside Park United Memorial Church.
 Eric Winter as Luke Lourd, Carlene Cockburn's younger brother whose car is rear-ended by Amanda while he's not wearing pants. He becomes Amanda's love interest, which upsets Carlene greatly.
 Bruce Boxleitner as Burl Lourd, Carlene's uncle and Gigi's love interest.
 Lauran Irion as Laura Vaughn, Bill and Amanda's daughter. Amanda had feared Laura would be made fun of by the very clique/bully system she set up, but instead Laura was embraced as a "Fox." Amanda warned her daughter not to be part of this clique because it would corrupt her just like it did to Amanda when she was in high school, but Laura snapped back by saying that no matter what, she would never be like Amanda. Despite their differences, Laura openly expresses her love to her mother and tells her she is proud of her.
 Colton Shires as Will Vaughn, Bill and Amanda's son who Carlene said at first glance was the spitting image of Bill, Amanda's late husband.
 Alix Elizabeth Gitter as Alexandra Caruth-Reilly, Cricket's daughter and leader of the local "foxes". At her mother's suggestion, she takes Amanda's daughter Laura into the group as a way of keeping an eye on her. She had a breast augmentation with her mother's encouragement, which leads to public humiliation when her top breaks open during a pep rally.
 Mackinlee Waddell as McKinney Peacham, Sharon's daughter.
 Hartley Sawyer (Ryan Akir in the pilot) as Bozeman Peacham, Sharon's son.
 Jack DePew (Nick Krause in the pilot) as Landry Cockburn, Carlene's son.

Notable guests
 Tom Everett Scott as Andrew Remington a former high school nerdy classmate turned software billionaire from Seattle and Heather's lab partner in high school. They reconnect and start a relationship, but Andrew ends it when he realizes that he doesn't like living in Heather's high-profile social circle. 
 Donna Mills as Bitsy Lourd, Burl's jealous wife and Gigi's nemesis; dies by choking on barbecue at Gigi's party.
 Kevin Alejandro as Danny, a local butcher who offers to supply meat for Amanda's cookout on the condition that Heather goes on a date with him. Heather winds up liking him, but is concerned about the vast differences in their income.
 Grant Bowler as Mason Massey, a "frozen foods magnate and thoroughbred horse breeder." Sparks fly when Massey meets with Cricket (Miriam Shor) to negotiate stud fee for his prize horse.
 Greg Vaughan as Bill Vaughn, Amanda's late husband, Laura and Will's father.
 Denton Blane Everett as Booth Becker, Blake's ex-ranch foreman and love interest.
 Sandra Bernhard as Debbie Horowitz, a wannabe Aztec terrorist
 Sheryl Crow as Herself

Episodes

Development and production

Jennifer Aspen became the first actress cast in the pilot in February 2011. Aspen plays the role of Sharon Peacham. On March 1, 2011, it was announced that Leslie Bibb had landed the role of Amanda Vaughn in the pilot. Annie Potts also joined the show as Amanda's overbearing mother. Potts fielded 3 pilot offers before settling on GCB. Creator Robert Harling went to high school with Potts and based the character of Gigi on Potts' own mother.

On March 4, 2011, Deadline announced that Miriam Shor had joined the cast. On March 10, 2011, it was announced that Marisol Nichols had also joined the ensemble cast. On March 14, 2011, it was announced that Kristin Chenoweth had landed the lead role of Carlene Cockburn, the GCBs' queen bee. On March 16, 2011, David James Elliott was cast in the role of Ripp Cockburn, Carlene's husband.

On May 13, 2011, ABC picked up the pilot for the 2011–2012 television season. Ten episodes were produced for the first season. Season 1 premiered on March 4, 2012.

On December 1, 2011, it was announced that Sheryl Crow and Sandra Bernhard would be guest stars in the series.

Naming
ABC was contacted by a number of Christians and Christian organizations who objected to the original title of the series, Good Christian Bitches, as they believed the name was demeaning toward Christianity, while some advocates for women found it problematic to use the word "bitches" to refer to women. Word of the name change came along with ABC's announcement that it had ordered the series. The series was renamed Good Christian Belles which appeared in several promos before the final renaming to the initialism GCB. Several ABC affiliates in Texas and other states in the Bible Belt had threatened to not air the show if the name wasn't changed. It was known as GCB in Australia.

The American Family Association filed a petition against the show, arguing that "With a title like Good Christian B-tches, you can imagine what kind of show it will be. Even if they change the title, the content will still mock people of faith." Its sister group One Million Moms also called for a boycott of GCB as "blasphemy at its worst!" New York City councilor Peter Vallone, Jr. called for a boycott of GCB claiming the series is "yet another outrageous attack on the Christian faith." Series star Chenoweth, a self-proclaimed evangelical Christian, said "I certainly wouldn't do anything that would make fun of my own faith. This is just chocolate cake, and it's actually a love letter to Dallas."
Despite being retitled in the U.S., the series aired under its original title Good Christian Bitches in Denmark on Kanal 4, in Sweden on Kanal 5, in Norway on TV Norge and in the Netherlands on NET5. In Brazil and Latin America, it will air under its second working title Good Christian Belles on Canal Sony.

Reboot
In November 2018, it was announced that a reboot of the series was in the works at The CW from original producer ABC Studios as well as CBS Television Studios with writer Leila Cohan-Miccio set to executive produce alongside original executive producers Darren Star of Darren Star Productions and Aaron Kaplan of Kapital Entertainment, in addition to Kapital's Dana Honor. In February 2019, it was reported that the project would roll over to the next development cycle, with the producers expected to "start from scratch" on the adaptation.

Music
Most of the music heard on the show is available for purchase at the iTunes Store and went on sale every week consecutively, on the same day episodes aired. Music releases include "This Little Light of Mine" performed by Miriam Shor and Kristin Chenoweth and "Prayer of St. Francis" also by Chenoweth, originally recorded for her Some Lessons Learned album. There are also many unreleased songs, like "Jesus Is Just Alright with Me" by Shor, Chenoweth, Mark Deklin and Cast,  Deklin's "It's a Miracle", both from the episode Pride Comes Before a Fall, Sheryl Crow's "The Gospel According to Me" and Shor's rendition of "Amazing Grace", both from episode Forbidden Fruit.

Background
An official album release featuring songs from the soundtrack titled GCB: Music from Season One was planned for a May 8, 2012, release, although after news of cancellation the release was apparently postponed or cancelled as well. Series star Kristin Chenoweth contributed two tracks to the album; Other contributing artists include country duo The JaneDear Girls and singer-actress Emily West. It consists mainly of original country, Christian songs, and only a few songs (Jason McCoy, Rick Trevino and Elizabeth Cook's) that have been previously released. The entire soundtrack is available as individual singles on iTunes and Amazon, except "Can't Behave" by Brett Eldredge; none of Jeff Beal's original score from the show is included.

Track listing

Reception
The show received mixed reviews from critics. Metacritic gave it an aggregate score of 56 out of 100 or "mixed or average reviews" based on reviews from 21 critics.

The A.V. Club awarded the pilot episode with a disappointing grade of C−, remarking that the show failed to make an impression. Both critics, however, noted Chenoweth's performance as a highlight.

The show won the "TV You Betta Watch" category at Logo's 2012 NewNowNext Awards.

Eric Winter, who played Luke Lourd, said, "This is an extremely creative and smart show that just needs more of a chance to take off and run."

References

External links
 
 
 

2010s American comedy-drama television series
2010s American LGBT-related comedy television series
2010s American LGBT-related drama television series
2012 American television series debuts
2012 American television series endings
American Broadcasting Company original programming
Christianity in popular culture controversies
English-language television shows
Religious controversies in television
Religious controversies in the United States
Television controversies in the United States
Television series by ABC Studios
Television shows based on American novels
Television shows set in Dallas
Television series by Kapital Entertainment